Alice Júnior is a 2019 Brazilian coming of age film about a transgender teenager's first kiss. It was directed by Gil Baroni and written by Luiz Bertazzo and Adriel Nizer. Alice, played by Anna Celestino Mota, is a 17-year-old YouTuber who moves to the countryside where she is sent to a Catholic school and bullied.

References

External links 

2019 films
2019 romantic drama films
Brazilian LGBT-related films
Films about trans women
LGBT-related comedy-drama films
2010s Portuguese-language films
Teen LGBT-related films